Kinerma is a rural locality (a selo) in Pryazhinsky District of the Republic of Karelia, Russia.

In 2016 Kinerma was included in The Most Beautiful Villages in Russia.

References 

Rural localities in the Republic of Karelia
Pryazhinsky District
Cultural heritage monuments in the Republic of Karelia